Bleckhausen (in Eifel dialect: Blääkes) is an Ortsgemeinde – a municipality belonging to a Verbandsgemeinde, a kind of collective municipality – in the Vulkaneifel district in Rhineland-Palatinate, Germany. It belongs to the Verbandsgemeinde of Daun, whose seat is in the like-named town.

Geography

Location 
The municipality lies southeast of Weidenbach between the Kleine Kyll and the Lieser in the Volcanic Eifel, a part of the Eifel known for its volcanic history, geographical and geological features, and even ongoing activity today, including gases that sometimes well up from the earth.

Southeast of the village lies the nature conservation area Wacholdergelände bei Bleckhausen (“Juniper Lands near Bleckhausen”), the biggest of its kind anywhere in the Eifel.

History 
On 15 June 1354, Bleckhausen had its first documentary mention when Archbishop of Trier Bohemond II (1354–1362) acknowledged the chapel at Bleckhausen built under Archbishop Baldwin (1307–1354). The village belonged to the Electoral-Trier Amt of Manderscheid. In 1721, there were 25 inhabitants in Bleckhausen.

During the time of French administration, Bleckhausen was raised to parish; formerly, it was parochially bound with Manderscheid. Schutz was also assigned to the parish of Bleckhausen.

Politics

Municipal council 
The council is made up of 8 council members, who were elected by majority vote at the municipal election held on 7 June 2009, and the honorary mayor as chairman.

Coat of arms 
The German blazon reads: In Silber ein roter Schrägrechtsbalken, belegt mit einer goldenen Zickzackleiste; oben ein schwarzes Antoniuskreuz, unten drei blaue Wellenleisten.

The municipality’s arms might in English heraldic language be described thus: Argent a bend gules surmounted by a bendlet dancetty Or, in sinister a cross tau sable and in dexter three bars wavy azure.

The bend (diagonal stripe) overlaid with the thinner zigzag stripe (“bendlet dancetty”) was inspired by the arms once borne by the Counts of Manderscheid, once and long Bleckhausen’s lords. The T-shaped cross is Saint Anthony’s cross, and thus a reference to the local patron saint. The bars represent both the municipal limits and the charming pastoral scenery, characterized by the Kleine Kyll, Waldbach and Trombach valleys.

Culture and sightseeing

Buildings 
 Belonging to the municipality is the Bleckhausener Mühle, a gristmill under monumental protection on the Kleine Kyll southwest of the village. It was first mentioned in 1718 (although the official state Directory of Cultural Monuments says that it dates from 1799). Parts of the milling works are still preserved. In the early 20th century, the miller’s family, numbering 14 members, was housed in the little mill building next to the workrooms.
 Saint Anthony’s Catholic Church (branch church), Hauptstraße 19, aisleless church from 1787, lengthened in 1846, additions to the side and the tower after 1945
 Alte Poststraße 4 – Quereinhaus (a combination residential and commercial house divided for these two purposes down the middle, perpendicularly to the street), apparently from 1870
 (Opposite) Brunnenstraße 2 a, well house, possibly from the 19th century
 Brunnenstraße 5 a – former school with half-hipped gables, partly covered in slates, apparently from 1843
 Brunnenstraße 12 – Quereinhaus from 1818, cobbled yard
 Brunnenstraße/corner of Alte Poststraße – well house, possibly from the 19th century
 Hauptstraße – sandstone wayside cross from 1810

Natural monuments 
Among these are the juniper heath and the Drei Eichen (“Three Oaks”) natural monument.

Further reading 
 about the Bleckhausener Mühle: Heimatjahrbucharchiv Landkreis Vulkaneifel. Ein Projekt der Kreisverwaltung Vulkaneifel in Zusammenarbeit mit dem Weiss-Verlag, Büro Daun. Jhrg. 2004 S. 69

References 

Vulkaneifel